Högre mark is a song written by Staffan Hellstrand, and recorded by Idde Schultz on 1995 album Idde Schultz, and released as a single the same year. She also recorded the song with lyrics in English, as Higher Ground, which was released as a single in 1996.

The song has also been recorded by Staffan Hellstrand himself, on the 2000 compilation album Staffan Hellstrands bästa.

The song has also been recorded by Sara Wikström on her 2007 album Sara Wikström.

The song also charted at Svensktoppen, where it stayed for two weeks between 25 November-2 December 1995, placed at eight and sixth position, before leaving chart.

References

1995 singles
1996 singles
Swedish songs
Swedish-language songs
Songs written by Staffan Hellstrand
Idde Schultz songs
1995 songs